Anna Maria Grear (born 4 September 1959) is an English academic, author, and political activist. Grear is the founder of several academic and activist organisations, including the Global Network for the Study of Human Rights and the Environment (GNHRE) and the Journal of Human Rights and the Environment, where she is editor-in-chief. Grear is Professor of Law and Theory at Cardiff University and has written for such international newspapers as The Wire and Süddeutsche Zeitung.

Biography

Education
Grear graduated from the University of Bristol (LLB (Hons)), Oxford Brookes University (DLL) and First Class from St Hilda's College, Oxford, where she has a Bachelor of Civil Law degree.

Professorships and jurisprudence
From May 2000 to January 2006, Grear was a senior lecturer in law at Oxford Brookes University; from February 2006 to January 2012, she was a senior lecturer in law at the University of the West of England. From February 2012 to June 2013, she was associate professor of law at the University of Waikato, New Zealand. In 2013, she took up a post as reader in Law at Cardiff University, where she holds a Personal Chair as Professor of Law and Theory.

Grear holds professional memberships at several international institutions. She is an Invited Professor at the Westminster Centre for Law and Theory in London, a member of the Dahrendorf Network in Berlin, and a member of the United Nations Sustainable Development Solutions Network. Additionally, Grear remains an adjunct Professor of Law at the University of Waikato in New Zealand, an Associate Fellow of the New Economy Law Centre at Vermont Law School, and a Global Affiliate to the Vulnerability and Human Condition Collaboration at Emory University.

Grear's work focuses on a range of issues around law's dominant imaginary, the way it constructs the world, imagines the human and the more-than-human. Her work therefore embraces questions around legal subjectivity, the meaning of the human, rights theory, human rights theory and human rights and the environment.

Political and environmental activism
In March 2010, Grear founded the Journal of Human Rights and the Environment, a double-blind peer-reviewed scholarly journal. She has served as editor-in-chief ever since.

With Professor Tom Kerns, Grear co-initiated the Permanent Peoples' Tribunal on Climate Change, Fracking and Human Rights. The online tribunal hearings were streamed globally from 14 to 18 May 2018 in a first for the Permanent Peoples' Tribunal. The Advisory Opinion recommended a world-wide ban on fracking. Commenting on the tribunal, Grear said "the PPT will play a unique and vitally important role in presenting and rehearsing testimony, arguments and law to lay down an informal but highly expert precedent, with potential for future use in national and international courts of law. The PPT will also educate a wide range of parties and the general public about the human rights dimensions of fracking. This really is a Peoples' tribunal. It belongs to communities and individuals from all over the world and it aims to produce a highly influential, legally literate and serious judgement of the issues by some of the world’s finest legal minds as a trail blazing example for future legal actions, when and where appropriate."

In 2018, Grear was one of 1,400 academics who wrote to The Sunday Times urging that Britain remain in the European Union.

Other work
In January 2010, Grear founded the Global Network for the Study of Human Rights and the Environment (GNHRE), an international network for scholars, policy-makers and activists "for the creation of change", where she is now former director. 

In 2014, she co-founded Incredible Edible Bristol, an urban food-growing movement, with horticulturist Sara Venn.

In 2022, Grear hosted a summit on fatigue, linking fatigue to planetary and environmental exhaustion, toxicities of contemporary life and to shifts in human consciousness. The summit was a combination of practical guidance for those with complex fatigue conditions, and imaginative thinking about fatigue as a signal to the 21st century and beyond. Guests included leading health and recovery experts, as well as a couple of scholars working with environmental themes, posthumanism and critical theory. Grear has since started a podcast, The Fatigue Files, which will continue the exploration of the summit themes.

Honours
In 2007, Grear was awarded a Visiting Scholarship at St John’s College, Oxford, which involved a competitive application process. Similarly competitive, she was awarded an International Seminar by the International Institute for the Sociology of Law in Oñati, Spain, in 2011. In the intervening years, she was appointed to several fellowships and professorships internationally, and in 2018 she was shortlisted for an IUCN Academy of Environmental Law Senior Scholarship Award.

Publications
Against closure: in search of pluralities and breakthroughs (2022)
Flat ontology and differentiation: in defence of Bennett’s vital materialism, and some thoughts towards decolonial new materialisms for international law (2022)
Posthuman legalities: new materialism and law beyond the human (2021) (with  E Boulot, ID Vargas-Roncancio, Joshua Sterlin)
The Great Awakening: New Modes of Life Amidst Capitalist Ruins (with co-editor David Bollier) (Punctum Books, 2020)
Embracing vulnerability: Notes towards human rights for a more-than-human world (2020)
Frames and contestations: environment, climate change and the construction of in/justice (2020) (with Julia Dehm)
Environmental Justice (2020)
Resisting Anthropocene neoliberalism: Towards new materialist commoning? (2020)
Legal imaginaries and the Anthropocene: ‘of’ and ‘for’ (2020)
Personhood, jurisdiction and injustice: Law, colonialities and the global order (2019) (with Associate Professor Elena Blanco)
Ecological publics: Imagining epistemic openness (2019)
It's wrong-headed to protect nature with human-style rights (2019)
Human rights and new horizons? Thoughts toward a new juridical ontology (2018)
Human Rights and Radical Social Transformation: Futurity, Alterity, Power by Kathryn McNeilly (2018)
Anthropocene “Time”?’–A reflection on temporalities in the ‘New Age of the Human (2018)
International Law, Social Change and Resistance: A Conversation Between Professor Anna Grear (Cardiff) and Professorial Fellow Dianne Otto (Melbourne) (2018)
'Anthropocene, Capitalocene, Chthulucene': Re-encountering environmental law and its 'subject' with Haraway and New Materialism' (2017)
Foregrounding vulnerability: Materiality’s porous affectability as a methodological platform (2017)
Crisis, injustice and response (2017)
The Declaration on Human Rights and Climate Change: A new legal tool for global policy change (2017) (with K Davies, S Adelman, CI Magallanes, T Kerns, SR Rajan)
Human rights accountability in domestic courts: corporations and extraterritoriality (2016) (with Professor Burns Weston)
Human Rights in the World Community: Issues and Action (University of Pennsylvania Press, 2016) (with Professor Burns Weston)
Human rights and the environment: a tale of ambivalence and hope (2016)
Towards new legal futures? In search of renewing foundations (2015)
An invitation to fellow epistemic travellers: Towards future worlds in waiting: human rights and the environment in the twenty-first century (2015) (with Professor Louis Kotzé)
Thought, law, rights and action in the age of environmental crisis (Edward Elgar Publishing, 2015) (with Evadne Grant)
The closures of legal subjectivity: why examining ‘law’s person’is critical to an understanding of injustice in an age of climate crisis (2015)
'Deconstructing Anthropos: A Critical Legal Reflection on ‘Anthropocentric’Law and Anthropocene ‘Humanity’ (2015)
Research handbook on human rights and the environment (Edward Elgar, 2015) (with Professor Louis Kotzé)
The Discourse of Biocultural Rights and the Search for New Epistemic Parameters: Moving beyond Essentialisms and Old Certainties in an Age of Anthropocene Complexity (2015)
The Betrayal of Human Rights and the Urgency of Universal Corporate Accountability: Reflections on a Post-Kiobel Lawscape (2015) (with Professor Burns Weston)
Penelope Simons and Audrey Macklin, The Governance Gap: Extractive Industries, Human Rights, and the Home State Advantage (2015)
Vulnerability: Reflections on a New Ethical Foundation for Law and Politics (Ashgate, 2014; co-editor Martha Albertson Fineman)
A human rights assessment of hydraulic fracturing and other unconventional gas development in the United Kingdom (2014) (with E Grant, T Kerns, KL Morrow, D Short)
Towards ‘climate justice’? A critical reflection on legal subjectivity and climate injustice: warning signals, patterned hierarchies, directions for future law and policy (2014)
Choosing a Future: Social and Legal Aspects of Climate Change (2014) (with Professor Conor Gearty)
'Vulnerability, Advanced Global Capitalism and Co-Symptomatic Injustice: Locating the Vulnerable Subject' (2013)
Law's entities: Complexity, plasticity and justice (2013)
Climate justice involves more than a fair distribution of benefits and burdens: It requires radical, structural change (2013)
Towards a new horizon: In search of a renewing socio-juridical imaginary (2013)
'Human bodies in material space: lived realities, eco-crisis and the search for transformation' (2013)
Vulnerability as Heuristic – An Invitation to Future Exploration (2013) (with Professor Martha Albertson Fineman)
Learning legal reasoning while rejecting the oxymoronic status of feminist judicial rationalities: a view from the law classroom (2012)
Should Trees Have Standing?: 40 Years On (Edward Elgar Publishing, 2012)
Human rights, property and the search for 'worlds other' (2012)
'Framing the project' of international human rights law: reflections on the dysfunctional 'family' of the Universal Declaration (2012)
Gender, Sexualities and Law: Critical Engagements (Gender, Sexualities and Law) (London Glasshouse, 2011)
'Mind the Gap': One Dilemma Concerning the Expansion of Legal Subjectivity in the Age of Globalisation (2011)
Editorial: Reflections on biodiversity and food supply: from the nano to the macro-political (2011)
Three feminist critiques of varying feminist capitulations to crisis-hegemony (Hart Publishing, 2011)
'Sexing the matrix': embodiment, disembodiment and the law–towards the re-gendering of legal rationality (2011)
The vulnerable living order: human rights and the environment in a critical and philosophical perspective (2011)
Multi-level governance for sustainability: reflections from a fractured discourse (2010)
Redirecting human rights: Facing the challenge of corporate legal humanity (Palgrave McMillan, 2010)
The missing feminist judgement in Rita Porter v commissioner of police for the metropolis (Hart Publishing, 2010)
L Westra, K Bosselmann and R Westra (eds.) Reconciling human existence with ecological integrity (2009)
Quasi-Public Land (New Oxford Companion to Law, 2008)
Rosemary Hunter, Sharon Cowan (eds): Choice and Consent: Feminist Engagements with Law and Subjectivity (2008)
Challenging corporate 'humanity': Legal disembodiment, embodiment and human rights (2007)
Human rights–human bodies? Some reflections on corporate human rights distortion, the legal subject, embodiment and human rights theory (2006)
The curate, a cleft palate and ideological closure in the Abortion Act 1967–time to reconsider the relationship between doctors and the abortion decision (2004)
A Tale of the Land, the Insider, the Outsider and Human Rights (2003)
Theorising the rainbow? The puzzle of the public-private divide (2003)

Organisations
Global Network for the Study of Human Rights and the Environment (GNHRE)
Journal of Human Rights and the Environment
Incredible Edible Bristol
Permanent Peoples' Tribunal on Climate Change, Fracking and Human Rights

References

Living people
1959 births
Aden emigrants to England
Alumni of St Hilda's College, Oxford
Alumni of the University of Bristol
Alumni of Oxford Brookes University
Academics of Oxford Brookes University
Academics of Cardiff University
Academics of the University of the West of England, Bristol
Academic staff of the University of Waikato
Climate activists
English human rights activists
Women human rights activists
Women founders
Organization founders
British magazine founders
British political activists
Political science journal editors
Legal scholars of the University of Oxford